Shirin was the wife of Sassanid Persian king Khosrow II.

Shirin may also refer to:

People
Shirin Akiner (1943–2019), British historian
Shirin Bina (born 1964), Iranian actress
Shirin Darasha (1938–2012), Indian educator
Shirin Ebadi (born 1947), Iranian lawyer and Nobel Prize winner
Shirin Guha (born 1986), Indian actress 
Shirin Guild (born 1946), Iranian fashion designer
Shirin Mirzayev (1942–1992), Azeri military officer
Shirin Neshat (born 1957), Iranian artist
Shirin Nezammafi (born 1979), Iranian writer
Shirin Oskooi (born 1983), former senior executive at Yahoo!
Shirin M. Rai (born 1960), Indian political scientist
Shirin R. Tahir-Kheli (born 1944), American political scientist and diplomat

Places
Qasr-e Shirin, Kermanshah Province, Iran
Shirin, Eqlid, Iran
Shirin, Fars, Iran
Shirin, Kohgiluyeh and Boyer-Ahmad, Iran
Shirin, Razavi Khorasan, Iran
Shirin, Sistan and Baluchestan, Iran
Shirin, Uzbekistan

Other uses
 Shirin Farhad (disambiguation), story about the Sassanid queen
 Shirin (crater), a crater located on Saturn's moon Enceladus
 Shirin (film), an Iranian film
 USS Shirin (SP-915), a United States Navy ship

Persian feminine given names